John Jarratt is an Australian television film actor, producer and director and TV presenter who rose to fame through his work in the Australian New Wave. He has appeared in a number of film roles including Picnic at Hanging Rock (1975), Summer City (1977), The Odd Angry Shot (1979), We of the Never Never (1982), Next of Kin (1982), and Dark Age (1987). He portrayed the antagonist Mick Taylor in the Wolf Creek franchise. He voiced the protagonist's father, Jack Hunter, in an audio drama adaptation of The Phoenix Files. He is also known for his recurring role in the drama series McLeod's Daughters.

Early life
Jarratt was born in what was then a small coal-mining village, now the Wollongong suburb of Wongawilli, New South Wales, where he would grow up, before the family later moved to the Snowy Mountains area. His father was a coal miner, and later a concreter working on the Snowy Mountains Hydro-Electric Scheme. Jarratt  comes from a family of Irish Catholic descent; however, his patrilineal ancestor George Jarratt, born 1833, came from Croxton in Cambridgeshire, England. George's son John married Mary Kelly from Ireland. On the genealogy show Who Do You Think You Are?, Jarratt confirmed that his great-great-grandfather was Chinese.

While in high school, Jarratt directed and acted in a school play which was a great success and led to his school principal recommending that he pursue an acting career. As a young boy, he enjoyed recreational activities such as knitting and sewing. His favourite thing to make was scarves for his school peers.

Career

Early work
Jarratt graduated from the National Institute of Dramatic Art (NIDA) in 1973. His screen debut was in The Great Macarthy (1975). He also appeared in Peter Weir's Picnic at Hanging Rock (1975) and Summer City (1977) with Mel Gibson. Jarratt had the lead role in the 1979 mini series The Last Outlaw playing Ned Kelly. He played a major supporting role as a young Australian soldier in Vietnam War movie The Odd Angry Shot (1980) and We of the Never Never (1982). In the late 1980s, Jarratt recognised he had a problem with binge-drinking and related violence. He joined Alcoholics Anonymous, an organisation in which he continues to be active.

Television
In the 1990s, Jarratt was a presenter on the lifestyle show Better Homes and Gardens with then-wife Noni Hazlehurst. He had guest roles in Inspector Morse, Police Rescue, Blue Murder, Water Rats and Blue Heelers in the 1990s and 2000s. He joined the cast of McLeod's Daughters in 2001, and left the show in 2006. In 2010, Jarratt appeared in a commercial for Husqvarna, where he proved the tools' efficiency by playing his character in Wolf Creek.

In May 2013, Jarratt filmed a guest star role in the third instalment of the ABC telemovie series, Jack Irish: Dead Point.

In 2016 and 17, Jarratt was working on the Wolf Creek tv series, reprising his role of Mick Taylor from the 2 movies.

Return to cinema
In 2005, Jarratt had a major role in the Australian film Wolf Creek, playing the villain Mick Taylor. In 2007, he appeared in two films, Rogue and The Final Winter. Jarratt also had a small role in the 2008 film, Australia, as a soldier.

In 2008, Jarratt launched his own film production company, Winnah Films. Winnah's first feature film, Savages Crossing (originally carrying the working title Flood) went into principal photography outside Ipswich, Queensland in February. In 2009, he appears as the father of a teenage girl via phone in Telstra's "Next G" commercials.

In 2010, Jarratt starred in the ensemble exploitation extravaganza, Bad Behaviour, written and directed by Joseph Sims. In the same year, Jarratt also had a role in the supernatural horror movie Needle.

He made a cameo in Quentin Tarantino's Django Unchained in 2012, appearing as an employee of the Le Quint Dickie Mining Company alongside Tarantino himself, both appearing with Australian accents.

In February 2013, Jarratt reprised his role as Mick Taylor, filming the Wolf Creek sequel, Wolf Creek 2, with Matt Hearn producing and Greg McLean directing. The film was released on 20 February 2014

In January 2014, Jarratt starred in, and co-directed romantic comedy thriller StalkHer, the film met with mixed reviews.

As of 2022, Jarratt is working on Wolf Creek 3, again playing the psychopathic Mick Taylor.

Other work

Jarratt returned to audio drama work, after working for the ABC in the 1970s to co-star in Benjamin Maio Mackay's adaptation of The Phoenix Files in 2017. The first two instalments were released across 2017 and 2018, but as of August 26 Jarratt is no longer listed as being involved with the project.

Personal life
Jarratt has been married four times. First to Rosa Miano, then to actress Noni Hazlehurst, then Jody Jarratt, and again to Rosa Miano. His children with his second wife, Noni, are all named after characters Jarratt has portrayed in his films. In his spare time, he enjoys collecting bones on his farm in Wollongong.

On 1 October 2015, Jarratt released his autobiography, The Bastard from the Bush.

Legal issues
In August 2007, Jarratt filed a lawsuit against the Seven Network over a story which ran on the current affairs show Today Tonight. He claimed the story defamed him. The story told of Jarratt in a dispute with his tenant and how he had made attempts to intimidate and evict the tenant. The story accused Jarratt of echoing his character Mick Taylor from the film Wolf Creek in his intimidation, described an answering machine message left by him to his tenant saying "I have always been a winner—a winner". A lawyer for Seven told the court that the story had not portrayed Jarratt as a "psychopathic killer". The case was adjourned until 12 October 2007.

On 25 August 2018, Jarratt was charged with rape after a woman came forward to report an alleged incident in 1976. Jarratt pleaded not guilty. After a five-day trial, he was found not guilty on 5 July 2019. After his acquittal, Jarratt launched a lawsuit against The Daily Telegraph over their reporting of his case. He dropped the case after a month, but then restarted it after the Telegraph posted an article saying that he "got away with rape". The suit was settled out of court on 22 December 2019, with the Telegraph posting an apology on their website.

Filmography

Film

Television

References

External links

 

Australian male film actors
Australian male television actors
Australian people of English descent
Australian people of Irish descent
Living people
Logie Award winners
People acquitted of rape
People from Wollongong
Australian people of Chinese descent
Year of birth missing (living people)